Wait for Me. Remixes! is a remix album by American electronica musician Moby. It was released on May 17, 2010. The album contains reworked versions of songs from Moby's 2009 album Wait for Me, as well as a DJ mix by Moby himself.

It was announced on Moby's official website on March 23, 2010.

Track listing

Charts

References

External links 
 
 

2010 remix albums
Albums produced by Moby
Moby albums
Mute Records albums